The Union for Justice and Democracy (UJD) was a political party in Togo.

History
The UJD won two of the 81 seats in the 1994 parliamentary elections.

In November 1996 the party merged into the ruling Rally of the Togolese People.

References

Defunct political parties in Togo
1996 disestablishments in Togo
Political parties disestablished in 1996